Quasipetalichthyidae is a family of primitive petalichthyid placoderms from Givetian-aged marine strata of Yunnan, China, and possibly Vietnam.  The family contains two confirmed genera, Quasipetalichthys, and Eurycaraspis, which differ from the more advanced macropetalichthyids by having more squared skulls that have the eye sockets placed on the side of their skulls, rather than nearer to the center.  More basal petalichthyids, such as Diandongpetalichthys and Neopetalichthys, differ from the quasipetalichthyids by having comparatively elongated skulls.

References

Placoderms of Asia
Placoderm families
Petalichthyida
Middle Devonian extinctions
Middle Devonian first appearances